Robert Dwyer Joyce (1830–1883) was an Irish poet, writer, and collector of traditional Irish music.

Life
He was born in County Limerick, Ireland, where his parents, Garret and Elizabeth (née O'Dwyer) Joyce, lived in the northern foothills of the Ballyhoura Mountains, west of Ballyorgan. Robert had three brothers: Michael, John and Patrick, a noted scholar. The family claimed descent from one Seán Mór Seoighe (fl. 1680), a stonemason from Connemara, County Galway.

Robert Joyce became a civil servant and succeeded his brother Patrick as principal of the Model School, Clonmel. He was a collector of Irish traditional music and contributed many airs, which were included in The Petrie Collection of the Ancient Music of Ireland, published in 1855. To finance his studies he contributed poems, stories and articles to a number of periodicals, including the Nation and the Harp. He produced a volume of poems, but remains most famous for contributions to Irish music. "The Wind that Shakes the Barley", "The Blacksmith of Limerick", and "The Boys of Wexford" are some of his better-known works.

He studied medicine in Queens College, Cork and became a doctor in 1865. In this year he was appointed Professor of English at the Catholic University, Dublin. Disappointed with the results of the 1866 Fenian rising in Ireland,  he emigrated to Boston, where he practised medicine. He had literary success with Ballads of Irish Chivalry (1872) and Deirdre (1876). This latter sold 10,000 copies in its first week of publication. He returned in 1883 to Dublin, where he died the same year.

A plaque inscribed in Irish and English marks the house in Glenosheen where the Joyce brothers lived. It is signposted from the road between Ardpatrick and Kildorrery.

His poem "The Battle of Benburb" commemorating a victory of Owen Roe O'Neill in the Irish Confederate Wars was later set to music as a popular ballad.

The title of his poem, "The Wind That Shakes the Barley", was borrowed for the Ken Loach film, which won the Palme d'Or at the Cannes Film Festival in 2006.

References

External links
 

1830 births
1883 deaths
Irish poets
19th-century Irish medical doctors
19th-century poets
Alumni of University College Cork
Irish folk-song collectors
Musicians from County Limerick
19th-century musicologists